The 1984 Camus Singapore Masters was a professional non-ranking snooker tournament which took place between 21 and 22 August 1984 at the Mandarin Hotel in Singapore.

The event was held as a round robin with each player facing the others once. Professionals Steve Davis, Terry Griffiths and Tony Meo participated along with two local players, Benjamin Liu and Lau Weng Yew. Griffiths won the tournament, finishing unbeaten, and placing top of the round robin league table on points countback, ahead of Davis.

Results

References

1984 in snooker
Sport in Singapore